Andrea Centazzo (born 1948) is an Italian-born American composer, percussionist, multimedia artist and record label founder.

Music career
Centazzo was born in Udine, Italy. In the 1970s he played percussion in avant-garde jazz with John Zorn, Steve Lacy, and Don Cherry, and became "a leading figure in the European avant-garde".

After 1986 he turned to video making and composed operas, film soundtracks and orchestral compositions. Since 1992, he has lived and worked in Los Angeles and has become a naturalized American citizen. He has also performed and recorded with Albert Mangelsdorff, Alvin Curran, Anthony Coleman, Evan Parker, Fred Frith, Gianluigi Trovesi, Henry Kaiser, Sylvano Bussotti, Teo Jöergesmann, Tom Cora, and Toshinori Kondo. He has conducted his own compositions with the American Youth Symphony, the L.A. Contemporary Orchestra, the Mitteleuropa Orchestra, and many ensembles. He has directed and staged his own opera compositions as well as theatrical plays by other U.S. authors.

Centazzo has also created multimedia projects that fuse acoustic instruments, electronic instruments, and video. His multimedia projects include Mandala, Eternal Traveler, Einstein's Cosmic Messengers, and R-Evolution. In more recent live performances he has given solo multimedia concerts, accompanying his own videos.

Centazzo has recorded over 60 LP's and CD's, and has composed 350 musical works of diverse types, in addition to writing eight musicology books. In 2012 the Library of the University of Bologna opened the "Fondo Andrea Centazzo" with a collection of his works and documents.

Instrumental innovations
During his earlier career Centazzo developed a number of percussion instruments, including the icebell, a bowl-shaped instrument made from a bronze alloy. In his 1980 work Indian Tapes he introduced the ogororo, lokole, tampang, tubophone and square bell, based on Native American instruments.

ICTUS
The ICTUS record label was founded in 1976 by Centazzo and his wife, Carla Lugli. Its first release was Clangs by Centazzo and Steve Lacy. Subsequent albums also featured Andrew Cyrille and Lol Coxhill, among others. The label was wound up after eight years owing to financial difficulties, but was revived in 1995 and again in 2006.

Compositions
Major compositions by Centazzo include the multimedia opera Tina (1996), The Soul in the Mist (2006), Moon in Winter (2011), The Heart of Wax (2012), and the multimedia project Tides of Gravity (2016). This last was produced in association with LIGO, NASA and Caltech to mark the first detection of gravitational waves.

Music albums

Source:

Filmography
 1986 Romance
 1992 Obiettivo indiscreto
 1995 Shadow of a Kiss (TV movie)
 1995 Star Struck
 1999 I Karaoke (short)
 2001 The Circle (short)
 2009 La Corsa (short)
 2009 Mei Mei (short)
 2009 Toto Forever (short)
 2010 Desire Street
 2013 Ni Jing: Thou Shalt Not Steal
 2015 Floating Melon
 2016 Advent (film)

Books

References

External links
 Official Andrea Centazzo website
 IMDb listing
 Paiste Gongs
 Ictus Movies - YouTube
 Allmusic

American classical composers
Italian classical composers
Italian percussionists
1948 births
Living people
American male classical composers
American percussionists
20th-century Italian composers
21st-century American composers
21st-century classical composers
20th-century American male musicians
21st-century American male musicians